The Church of Saint Sarkis in Tekor (also known as the Tekor Basilica ) was a 5th-century Armenian church built in historical Armenia. It was located facing the town of Digor in the Kars Province of Turkey, about 16 kilometers west of the Armenian border.  Tekor was a three aisled basilica with a dome.  It was severely damaged by earthquakes in 1912 and 1936, and later damaged by vandalism.  Now only the lower parts of the rubble and concrete core of the walls remain, the facing stone apparently removed to build the town hall (now itself demolished) in the 1960s.  The inscription dating the building to the 480s was the oldest known writing in the Armenian language.

Architectural significance 
The Basilica of Saint Sarkis is significant in Armenian architectural history because its stone dome was among the earliest to be constructed in Armenia. Until its destruction, Tekor was the oldest extant domed church in Armenia.

See also 
 Yererouk, a contemporaneous 4th-5th century Armenian basilica about 18 kilometres northwest of Digor, in Armenia.

References

Bibliography 

 Տեկորի տաճարը, Թորոս Թօրամանեան, Թիֆլիս, 1911։

Armenian Apostolic churches in Turkey
Oriental Orthodox congregations established in the 5th century
Destroyed churches in Turkey
Demolished buildings and structures in Turkey
Armenian buildings in Turkey